John Zarrella is an American news correspondent. He worked for CNN from 1981–2014. He was the principal correspondent for CNN's coverage of the U.S. space program, covering such events such as John Glenn’s 1998 return to space, the Mars Pathfinder mission and numerous space shuttle launches. Zarrella was the CNN network correspondent on site when the 1986 Challenger shuttle disaster occurred. In 2011, Zarrella covered the final flights of the Space Shuttle program. In 2020 he made an appearance in Challenger the Final Flight recounting covering the Challenger disaster.

External links and references
 John Zarrella at CNN
 John Zarrella's website

Year of birth missing (living people)
Living people
American television reporters and correspondents
CNN people